Krishnapuram is a village in Alappuzha district in the Indian state of Kerala.

Demographics
 India census, Krishnapuram  had a population of 25927 with 12305 males and 13622 females.

Krishnapuram Palace

The Krishnapuram Palace is a tourist attraction, just 400 m from NH-47 located between Kayamkulam town and Oachira. The palace is maintained by the Archaeological Department and contains exhibits that belonged to the Palace and its former occupant, the Travancore Maharaja Marthanda Varma. It is also famous for a large pond within the palace. It is said that an underground escape route runs from the bottom of the pond as a possible escape route from enemies. The Gajendra Moksham, mural painting in the palace is the largest in Kerala. The two-edged Kayamkulam Vaal (sword) is also on display here. The palace also houses, in its courtyard, one of the four statues of Buddha in Alappuzha District. Manivelikadavu 9.5 km from Kayamkulam Pipe Junction is also close by.

Krishnapuram Palace is one of the finest and rarest examples of a typical Keralite style of architecture - complete with gabled roofs, narrow corridors and dormer windows. Residence of the rulers of Kayamkulam kingdom (Oodanadu Raja Vamsham), the age of the palace is unknown. Renovated some time in the 18th century, the palace is today a protected monument under the Archaeology department. Recently it has again been renovated according to the scientific techniques prescribed for the protection of heritage buildings. Today the palace is an archaeological museum, and the most fascinating exhibit here is the 49 sq.m Gajendra Moksham, the largest single band of mural painting so far discovered in Kerala. Gajendra Moksham means the salvation (Moksha) of the elephant king (Gajendra). The theme of the mural is mythological and depicts an elephant saluting Lord Vishnu in devotion while the other gods, goddesses and saints look on. It is said that Lord Vishnu was the family deity of the Kayamkulam rajas. This mural was placed at the pond-side entrance to the palace to enable the rajas to worship the deity after their ablutions.

The famous Kayamkulam Val (sword) is also on display here. Both its edges are sharpened so it is more dangerous than other martial weapons and requires handling by skilled warriors. It is believed that it was used by the Kayamkulam raja and was a favourite of his. Other attractions here include the beautifully landscaped garden in the palace compound where you have a variety of flora typical of Kerala, and a newly erected Buddha mandapam, where a recently recovered statue of the Buddha is housed. Other collections at the museum include rare antique bronze sculptures and paintings. Krishnapuram Palace - Getting there: Krishnapuram Palace - Nearest railway station: Kayamkulam about 6 km; Nearest airports: Thiruvananthapuram International Airport, about 103 km; Cochin International Airport, about 132 km.

Educational Institutions
 Junior Technical School(JTS) and Vocational Higher Secondary School(VHSC)
 Bishop Moore Vidyapith Kayamkulam
 Government Lower Primary(LP) School
 ViswaBharathy Model High School

Religious Places

Temples
 Arthi Kavu Nagaraja-Shiva Temple
 Krishnapuram  Sree Krishna Swami Temple 
 Major Sree Krishna Temple
 Kurakkav Devi Temple. It is famous for offering vettila (betel leaf) to Devi. Lord Shiva is worshiped in the form of Kiratha Moorthy.
 Kalathi Sree Bhadra Devi Temple
 Vethalan Kavu Mahadeva Temple, Kappil East
 Kuttiyil Sri Durga Devi Temple, Kappil East
 Mannoor Madom Siva Temple, Opp. Oachira KSEB, Krishnapruam South, Krishnapuram P O

Churches
 St. John's CSI Church
 Bethel Faith ministries international church, Njakkanal

References

External links 

 https://web.archive.org/web/20110713144209/http://www.keralafreelisting.com/info/krishnapuram-palace-alappuzha 
 http://www.alappuzhaonline.com/krishnapurampalace-kerala.htm

Villages in Alappuzha district